Kolme katku vahel is a novel by the Estonian author Jaan Kross. It was first published in 1970. The main character of the historical novel is Balthasar Russow (1536–1600), one of the most important Livonian and Estonian chroniclers.

It was published in English translation in three volumes in 2016, 2017, and 2022 as "Between Three Plagues" (Vol. 1: The Ropewalker; vol. 2: A People Without A Past; vol. 3: A Book of Falsehoods).

Publication in English
The Ropewalker. Between Three Plagues vol. 1 	London: MacLehose Press. 2016; translation by Merike Lepasaar Beecher 
A People Without A Past. Between Three Plagues vol. 2 	London: MacLehose Press, 2017; translation by Merike Lepasaar Beecher. 
A Book of Falsehoods. Between Three Plagues vol. 3 	London: MacLehose Press, 2022; translation by Merike Lepasaar Beecher. 

Estonian novels
1970 novels